Mike's Murder is a 1984 American neo-noir mystery film written and directed by James Bridges and starring Debra Winger, Mark Keyloun and Paul Winfield.

Plot
In Los Angeles, bank teller Betty Parrish (Debra Winger) has a one-night stand with a young tennis instructor named Mike Chuhutsky (Mark Keyloun), but then has only random contact with him over the course of the next two years.

He is a drug dealer. One day Mike calls to tell her he is being chased for encroaching on another criminal's territory. Later, a friend of his calls to say Mike is dead, brutally murdered.

Betty cannot let go of him without understanding him better and tries to find out more. It leads to her discovering Mike's hidden side, including a disturbed acquaintance of his named Pete (Darrell Larson) and a record producer named Philip (Paul Winfield) who apparently was involved with Mike in a gay relationship. Betty's life is placed in peril by the story's end.

Cast
 Debra Winger as Betty Parrish
 Mark Keyloun as Mike Chuhutsky
 Darrell Larson as Pete
 Brooke Alderson as Patty
 Paul Winfield as Philip Green
 Robert Crosson as Sam Morris
 Daniel Shor as Richard
 William Ostrander as Randy
 Kym Malin as Beautiful Girl #1

Production 
Warner Brothers reportedly was unhappy about the project because of its premise with the drug-fixated underpinnings of the L.A. entertainment world and refused to release it until Bridges made some cuts and changes.

The film originally was edited so that the events played chronologically backwards and featured a score by singer Joe Jackson. Bridges' original edit was poorly received by test audiences, and Warner Bros. forced him to re-edit it so the story unfolded in a more conventional way. Jackson's score was replaced by a new John Barry score. However, most of Jackson's songs remain in the film.

Bridges wrote the film for Winger, having worked with her on Urban Cowboy. Her performance in Mike's Murder led the critic Pauline Kael to describe Winger as "a major reason to go on seeing movies in the 1980s".

DVD release 
Warner Bros. Digital Distribution released Mike's Murder on 4 August 2009, as part of the Warner Archive Collection series.

References

External links 
 
 
 
 
 
 

1984 films
1980s crime thriller films
American crime thriller films
American mystery thriller films
1980s English-language films
Films scored by John Barry (composer)
Films about the illegal drug trade
1984 LGBT-related films
Films directed by James Bridges
Films set in Los Angeles
Warner Bros. films
The Ladd Company films
1980s mystery thriller films
American neo-noir films
1980s American films